John Clifford Bell (born 18 January 1949 in Ipswich, Queensland) is a former Australian first-class cricketer and Sheffield Shield coach who played two matches for Queensland Bulls in 1978/79 as well as a match for Tasmania Tigers in 1979 as a wicket-keeper.

References

External links
 
 

1949 births
Living people
Australian cricketers
Sportspeople from Ipswich, Queensland
Queensland cricketers
Tasmania cricketers
Wicket-keepers